Nogometni klub Radeče, commonly referred to as NK Radeče or simply Radeče, is a Slovenian football club which plays in the town of Radeče. The club was founded in 1930 and was known as Papirničar Radeče in the 1990s due to sponsorship reasons. Their kit colours are white, red, and blue.

Honours

MNZ Celje Cup
 Winners: 1993–94

League history since 1991

References

External links
Official website 

Association football clubs established in 1930
Football clubs in Slovenia
1930 establishments in Slovenia